National Geological Monuments are geographical areas of national importance and heritage, as notified by the Government of India's Geological Survey of India (GSI), for their maintenance, protection, promotion and enhancement of geotourism.

List of National Geological Monuments 

There are 34 notified National Geological Heritage Monument Sites of India. GSI or the respective State governments are responsible for taking necessary measures to protect these sites.

Geo-tourism sites in Northeast India 

There are 12 geo-tourism sites in Northeast India notified by the Geological Survey of India (GSI) for promotion of geo-tourism.

See also

 Monuments of National Importance of India
 State Protected Monuments of India
 List of World Heritage Sites in India
 List of Water Heritage Sites in India
 List of columnar jointed volcanics in India
 Menhirs in India
 List of rock-cut temples in India
 List of forts in India
 List of museums in India

References

External links
Monograph on national geoheritage sites of India, by INTACH
Interactive GIS map
Map
Information on Geo-Heritage sites

Geography of India
Geology of India

Tourism in India
Geotourism